Józefów is a town in east-central Poland, located in Masovian Voivodeship, in Otwock County. Located on a picturesque confluence of Vistula and Świder rivers, it is home to one landscape reserve and three natural reservation zones.  it had 18,157 inhabitants.

Gallery

References

External links

 Jewish Community in Józefów on Virtual Shtetl
 Museums and historical monuments at Józefów homepage.

Cities and towns in Masovian Voivodeship
Otwock County
Warsaw Governorate
Warsaw Voivodeship (1919–1939)